The OQ-15 was a prototype American subscale drone built for the US Army Air Forces in the mid-1940s.

In early 1945, the OQ-15 was built and tested by the USAAF, but only five were built. It was built to meet the same USAAF drone requirement as the Radioplane OQ-17.

Specification

See also

References

External links

1940s United States special-purpose aircraft
Unmanned aerial vehicles of the United States
Radioplane aircraft